Horror in the High Desert is a 2021 American film written, produced, and directed by Dutch Marich, in the pseudo-documentary format, and featuring found footage elements about the mysterious disappearance of a hiker in the High Desert region of Nevada.

Plot 
The first part of the documentary focuses on the police "missing person" report of amateur hiker Gary Hinge: Toward the end of July 2017, Gary hiked to an unspecified area in the Great Basin Desert (Nevada). His starting point was the town of Ruth and his target was presumably a cabin he had approached on a previous expedition. When he was two days past his estimated return date and did not return home, his housemate Simon Rodgers alerted Gary's sister, Beverly Hinge, who in turn notified the police. More than a week had passed since Gary had last been seen.

Initially, the police conducted a search based on the last GPS location of Gary's cell phone. Local and state police were involved, as well as park rangers and even volunteer groups. A few days later, it was reported that Gary's truck had been found, 55 miles from his departure in Ruth, Nevada, at the end of a dirt road at the bottom of a small hill. This finding prompted search parties, who covered large areas on foot, by helicopter and with the use of drones. None of the groups were able to find any trace or indication of Gary's location. When several more days passed without any news, the police terminated the search, as they considered that the chances of finding Gary alive were already practically nil, due to the fact that he used to travel with minimal supplies, water and equipment, which left him at the mercy of the weather (the hottest time of the year) and other dangers, such as the local fauna or the fact that there are multiple abandoned mining pits in the area. As time went by, the media stopped reporting on it. Subsequently, Beverly hired a private investigator, William 'Bill' Salerno, so that the case would not be abandoned. A reporter from a local media outlet, Gal Roberts, decided to convince her editor to keep on top of the story, lest it be forgotten as a "cold case".

Thus, the investigation then focused on the clues that could be obtained from the truck, now considered a crime scene. Two aspects stood out; first, numerous fingerprints that did not match Gary Hinge's were found all over the truck, especially on the steering wheel. In addition, a trail of barefoot footprints, also not matching Gary's, was found. Since the John Doe's fingerprints did not match any database, the police found themselves at a dead end. In parallel, Bill Salerno started digging into Gary's social networks and Gal Roberts finds a promising clue in the video blog where Gary used to post his hiking and survival adventures, under the alias "Scorpion Sam". The hiker had some 50,000 followers, a fact unknown to his family and people close to him. Several of his readers believe they have some idea about Gary's final whereabouts, and that the question about his final destination could be related to some of his publications.

In the next to last of the published videos, Gary appears in frame from his home, narrating a very unusual experience, which had left him very disturbed: In his last excursion, he had been walking for three days in an unknown area, when he noticed the smell of smoke. Following that trail, he found a dilapidated-looking cabin, as if abandoned, but with smoke coming out of an old chimney. However, a sense of "imminent danger" caused him to move away from the site and make camp away from the area. The next morning, Gary reported that he found a trail of barefoot footprints, and on the way back to his truck, he felt he was being watched, and even felt he was being followed. This publication had a lot of comments, most of them negative, where followers expressed serious doubts about Gary's account, questioning why he had not recorded anything and did not present any evidence; another large number of comments were from users demanding him to give the coordinates of the place and another part of the visitors of his blog challenged him to come back. Feeling the victim of cyber-bullying and visibly affected, Gary recorded and uploaded one last video, explaining that he would not give the exact location of the mystery cabin, since he did not want to encourage inexperienced people to venture into those desert regions, and informed that he would return to the site, accompanied by his video camera and a gun for protection.

Several weeks after the truck was found and search and rescue efforts were completed, a group of hikers in White Pine County reported that a backpack, which turned out to be the property of Gary Hinge, had been left at their campsite. Upon checking the contents of the backpack, aside from Gary's belongings and identification, his severed hand was found, still holding his video camera. Forensic analysis revealed that the hand had been severed from the victim while he was still alive, within a period of no more than five weeks. When authorities examined the memory card inserted into the camera, they discovered what happened to Gary on one fateful night.

The footage found reveals that Gary was indeed able to find his way back to the mystery cabin; his first video entry was recorded at dusk, mentioning that he had been on the road for a day and a half and was sure of the route. Subsequently, he finds various markers he had left from his previous visit. Next, the following recordings consist of video fragments all recorded under infrared light, starting with Gary talking very frightened; he comments that he is already very close to the cabin and that he can smell smoke, as in the previous time. Suddenly, he hears chanting that seems to be a human voice, although it seems distorted. Once he finds the cabin, Gary confirms that it is the same one he saw earlier. While filming the outside of the cabin, Gary detects a human silhouette moving towards him. Being very careful not to make noise on the rocky ground, Gary tries to move away from the site, but is eventually spotted by a human-like being, but with severe physical deformities, who attacks him and the camera stops recording.

Both the reporter and the private investigator speculate what or who might have attacked and killed Gary; it is mentioned that the police have made this footage public in the hope that someone in the audience might offer some additional clue, which has sparked a series of conspiracy theories linking Gary's disappearance to real or supernatural issues as diverse as Area 51, atomic testing, local Indigenous rituals, satanic groups or extraterrestrials. However, Gal Roberts expresses serious concerns about the fact that at least 17 social media accounts have taken it upon themselves to make expeditions to the area. Additionally, one of these groups is said to have posted that they have managed to find the trail of the cabin and its mysterious occupant, and that they will reveal the results of their expedition in 2022.

Cast 
 Eric Mencis as Gary Hinge, extreme hiker.
 Tonya Williams-Ogden as Beverly Hinge, Gary's sister.
 Errol Porter as Simon Rodgers, Gary's housemate.
 David Morales as William 'Bill' Salerno, private investigator.
 Suziey Block as Gal Roberts, reporter.

Production 
Because it was shot safely and socially distant at the height of the COVID-19 pandemic, no two characters appear on screen at the same time and all interviews in the documentary were conducted via Zoom sessions.

Reception 
As an independent production, the film has gotten limited distribution, primarily through video-on-demand platforms.

The film had a special mention, within the found footage category, in The Last Journo portal's list of "The Best Horror Films of 2021".

Jamie Lawler reported for the Horror Buzz site that "in a genre that has seen a huge influx of found footage style films in recent years, it's easy for most to blend into the background. The unique mockumentary style coupled with the found footage in Horror in the High Desert makes for a memorable film that stands out among its peers." And awarded a 7/10 rating. Waylon Jordan of the iHorror portal noted that "there is a moment in every found footage film where reality takes a turn for the terrifying. That moment exists in Horror in the High Desert, but it doesn't come with a big bang as it often does in similar films. Instead, Marich carefully crafts a story that becomes more unsettling at times. He chooses a sense of dread over jump scares and character development over a bloated plot."

On the other hand, Steve Hutchison of the Tales of Terror site criticized the slow development of the entire film, given that the documentary portion absorbs too much of the film's time without providing definitive answers, "supporting almost nothing to the central narrative" and only the found footage portion generates the horror factor. He rated the film a 1.5/4.

Relationship to the Kenny Veach case 
The subject of the film is inspired by the real-life case of the disappearance of hiker Kenny Veach, who on November 10, 2014, went on an expedition in search of a cave he had found on a previous hike in the Nevada desert, never to be seen again. Veach reportedly made this trek after being questioned by multiple visitors to his YouTube channel asking him to document the discovery of a mysterious cave with a shape of the capital letter "M" at the entrance where he reportedly had a strange experience:

The entrance of the cave was shaped like an "M." Whenever I find a cave, I like to go inside... but when I went in there my whole body started to vibrate. The closer I got to the mouth of that cave, the more severe the vibration became in my whole body. I finally got scared and got out of there. It was one of the weirdest things that ever happened to me.

An extensive search was initiated in various parts of the desert, but without success. A few days later, on November 22, a search party found Kenny's cell phone in the vicinity of an abandoned mine entrance, but no other evidence or clues of the hiker.

References

External links 
 

2020s English-language films
2021 films
American horror thriller films
Films set in deserts
Films set in Utah
Found footage films
2020s American films